Alderson "Stretch" Propps (October 17, 1912 – August 10, 1993) was an American football player and coach. Propps was the athletic director and head football coach at the Morris Harvey College—now known as University of Charleston—in Charleston, West Virginia in 1946. He resigned after the first two games of the football season and was succeeded as head football coach his assistant C. Eddie King.

Propps was born on October 17, 1912, in Fayetteville, West Virginia. He died on August 10, 1993.

Head coaching record

College

Notes

References

External links
 Emory & Henry Hall of Fame profile
 

1912 births
1993 deaths
American football ends
Charleston Golden Eagles athletic directors
Emory and Henry Wasps football players
Charleston Golden Eagles football coaches
High school football coaches in Virginia
People from Fayetteville, West Virginia
Coaches of American football from West Virginia
Players of American football from West Virginia